Hotel Deauville was a hotel at 103 East 29th Street in Rose Hill, Manhattan, New York City, built in 1901. It was a seven-story brick and stone structure influenced by Beaux-Arts architecture, and was originally an apartment hotel known as Hatfield House. A modern 19-story hotel, designed by Arkan Zeytinoglu Architects and developed by Frank Savino, with 120 rooms, will replace the Hotel Deauville.

References

Hotels in Manhattan
Rose Hill, Manhattan